The Australian Dodgeball League (ADL) is a professional dodgeball league in Australia, found in 2015. The league is composed of 82 professional teams, which are divided between Australian states, the foremost of these being the Victoria League and the NSW League. These State Conferences come together at the end of each season, with the top two teams from the regions playing in the Australian Dodgeball Championships, the top level of Australian Dodgeball.

ADL Professional League

Formation 
The Australian Dodgeball League was formed in 2015. The league is currently played across two states, Victoria (VDL) and New South Wales (NSWDL). The opening season of the Victorian league had 23 teams that played in the regular league, and the New South Wales league had 8 entrant teams.

Venues 
Australian Dodgeball Leagues are held in central venues, where the game day matches are held, as opposed to the traditional home and away venues that other sports may operate with. The Victoria Dodgeball League holds game days at the Melbourne State Netball & Hockey Centre, and the New South Wales League holds game days at the Fairfield Youth & Community Centre.

Regular season 
During the course of a season each club plays each other side once. Teams receive two points for a win and one point for a draw. No points are awarded for a loss. Teams are ranked by total points, then point difference. The top two teams from each state level competition then proceed to the Australian Dodgeball Championships, where the top teams from across Australia play-off in an elimination format for the title of Australian Dodgeball Champions.

Championship Rounds 
Once the regular season has been played across the states, and the competitive tables have been finalised, the top two teams from each state league enter into the championship rounds. The top team from each league enters as the first seed for the competition, and plays against the bracketed second seed.

The Round of 16 is the opening round of the championship competition, with state seeding set between states with close proximity. Once the Round of 16 is over, states can play against teams from their own competition, depending on results.

Rules 
The Australian Dodgeball League has created their own National Dodgeball League rules for professional dodgeball competition.

Victorian Dominance 
Due to the size and scope of dodgeball in Australia, the early seasons of the Australian Dodgeball League was focused around Victoria, and to a lesser extent New South Wales. This dominance, and the ability to draw on talent for all the teams due to the interest and investment in the sport, meant that Victorian champions were often the favourites for the Championship titles, and those that followed the Victorian leagues developed a rivalry with the biggest challenger for their titles, the New South Wales clubs.

This dominance is in the process of waning however, with Victorian teams still counted among the most in the country, but as more teams are founded and develop, the influence of Victorians on the sport may come to lessen in the coming years.

State Rivalries 
Much like Australian state rivalries in rugby league and cricket, Victoria and New South Wales developed a grudge with each other, often focused around their meetings outside of the season, and in the Championship Rounds. Although movements between the leagues were common, games between Victorians and New South Welshmen developed a stigma as close, and tight-fought, matches.

Between the organizers of the two state leagues, the VDL and the NSWDL, there are current talks to hold a competition similar to rugby league's State of Origin series, where Victoria and New South Wales will put forward their best ten players each to compete in a Best of 3 series to determine the more dominant state.

Teams

Media coverage

See also

References

External links
 
 

Sports leagues in Australia
2015 establishments in Australia
Sports leagues established in 2015
Dodgeball
Professional sports leagues in Australia